They Got Amnesia is the fourth studio album by Moroccan-American rapper French Montana. It was released through Epic Records on November 19, 2021. The album features guest appearances from John Legend, Rick Ross, Kodak Black, the late Pop Smoke, Lil Durk, Doja Cat, Saweetie, Fivio Foreign, Fabolous, Coi Leray, 42 Dugg, Ty Dolla Sign, Latto, Lil Tjay, and Moneybagg Yo.

The album was updated on November 23, 2021. It features an additional guest appearance from Tory Lanez. Production was handled by Montana himself alongside Diddy, Hitmaka, Cardiak, FnZ, BoogzDaBeast, Butterbeats, Stoopidondabeat, Boi-1da, SMPLGTWY, Elemantastic, Lil CC, Paul Cabbin, Tee Romano, Pooh Beatz, Go Grizzly, London Jae, Reefa, Bordeaux, Non Native, Nik Dean, 12Keyz, Mixx, Harry Fraud, Aye YB, Kronic, Tay Keith, Keith-FF, Rich Steele, Slimwave, LayZbeats, and Armotunez. The project debuted and peaked at number 59 on the Billboard 200 for the chart week ending December 4, 2021.

Background and promotion
On November 1, 2021, French Montana announced the album alongside its title, cover art, and now-original release date. The album was supposed to be released on November 12, 2021, but was pushed by exactly one week for unknown reasons. The cover art of the project is inspired by the time when he was rushed to the hospital in November 2019 due to heart issues and nausea. Montana wrote, "grateful to be here to tell [his] story" and "2 years ago this same day, [he] was in [the] ICU fighting for [his] life. Loss of memory lost friends lost hope almost lost it all …. and when [he] was down [he] found out all [he] had was Allah… [Allah] picked [him] up and gave [him] a second chance …. while [he] was trying to bounce back they counted [him] out, and forgot everything [he] did". Exactly a week later, he revealed its tracklist. The track "Splash Brothers", which features Canadian rapper Drake, was originally supposed to appear on the album as the original fifth track before the tracklist got updated about a week later. The reason for the removal of the song was upon Drake's request prior to the album's release as he did not want to release or be featured on new music at the time due to the deaths from American rapper and singer Travis Scott's annual weekend Astroworld festival that occurred on November 5, 2021, in which Drake also performed at. However, Montana revealed that he plans to put the song on the upcoming deluxe edition of the album.

Singles
The album's lead single, "FMWGAB", was released on June 11, 2021, and a remix that features American rapper Moneybagg Yo also appears on the project. The second single, "I Don't Really Care", was released on October 29, 2021. The third single, "Panicking", a collaboration with American rapper Fivio Foreign, was released on November 5, 2021. The fourth and final single, "Handstand", a collaboration with American rapper and singer Doja Cat that features American rapper Saweetie, was sent to rhythmic contemporary radio on November 23, 2021.

Critical reception

They Got Amnesia received generally favorable reviews from critics upon release. At Metacritic, which assigns a normalized rating out of 100 to reviews from mainstream publications, the album received an average score of 68, based on 4 reviews. Robin Murray of Clash praised Montana's openness on the record, calling the album "his most open and autobiographical statement". Murray spoke on the numerous collaborations, saying it is "a collaborative workout, one that places all-time greats against newgen artists", while lauding the "string of unforgettable highs". Ultimately, Murray believed the album "succeeds in its ability to balance punchy, straight-up rap with a tinge of the bittersweet", and gave the album a rating of 7 out of 10.

Track listing

Charts

Release history

References

2021 albums
French Montana albums
Bad Boy Records albums
Epic Records albums
Albums produced by Boi-1da
Albums produced by Swizz Beatz
Albums produced by Harry Fraud
Albums produced by Hitmaka
Albums produced by Cardiak
Albums produced by Reefa